Two referendums were held in Switzerland during 1918. The first was held on 2 June on introducing a direct federal tax, and was rejected by a majority of voters and cantons. The second was held on 13 October 1918 on introducing proportional representation for National Council elections, and was approved by a majority of voters and cantons. As a result, proportional representation was introduced in the 1919 elections.

Background
Both referendums were popular initiatives, which required a double majority; a majority of the popular vote and majority of the cantons. The decision of each canton was based on the vote in that canton. Full cantons counted as one vote, whilst half cantons counted as half.

Results

Federal tax

Proportional representation

References

1918 referendums
1918 in Switzerland
Referendums in Switzerland